General elections were held in the Marshall Islands on 16 November 2015.

Electoral system
The 33 members of the Legislature were elected in 19 single-member constituencies and five multi-member constituencies of between two and five seats. The votes are cast for persons, not parties, and party membership is not listed on the ballots.

Results
The results are not reported by party affiliation. The Inter-Parliamentary Union reported that 23 out of the 33 elected senators are said to belong to Kien Eo Am (KEA). However, Marianas Variety reported that neither the KEA nor the group supporting President Christopher Loeak had won a majority, and that a group of six independents controlled the balance of power. Many prominent members of the formerly ruling party Aelon̄ Kein Ad (AKA), including half the cabinet members, lost their seats. The number of female senators went up from one to three, a record high.

Aftermath
On 4 January 2016 the Legislature elected Casten Nemra as President by a margin of one vote. However, he was dismissed two weeks later after a parliamentary no confidence vote ended 21–12 in favour. On 27 January 2016, a second election was held, resulting in Hilda Heine becoming the country's first female president.

References

Elections in the Marshall Islands
2015 in the Marshall Islands
Marshall
Election and referendum articles with incomplete results